Funari is a surname. Notable people with the surname include:

 Gianfranco Funari (1932–2008), Italian writer, television host, stand-up comedian, and actor
 Vicky Funari, American documentarist

See also
 Funaro
 Santa Caterina dei Funari, a church in Rome, Italy